Events from the year 1797 in Denmark.

Incumbents
 Monarch – Christian VII
 Prime minister – Andreas Peter Bernstorff (until 21 June), Christian Günther von Bernstorff

Events

 16 May  HDMS Najaden in battle with local ships off Tripoli.
 21 June – Prime Minister Andreas Peter Bernstorff dies, and is replaced by his son, Christian Günther von Bernstorff.
 5 July – Christian Ditlev Frederik, Count of Reventlow, is appointed to Minister of the State.

Culture

Art
 Jens Juel paints Niels Ryberg with his Son Johan Christian and his Daughter-in-Law Engelke, née Falbe.

Births
 22 May – Eleonora Zrza, opera soprano (died 1862)
 20 June – Georg Frederik Ursin, mathematician and astronomer (died 1849)
 7 October – Peter Georg Bang, politician and jurist, prime minister of Denmark (died 1861)
 25 August – Henrik Hertz, poet during the Danish Golden Age (died 1870)
 19 December – Jørgen Wichfeld, landowner (born 1729)

Deaths
 28 May – Marie Cathrine Preisler, stage actress (born 1761)
 21 June – Andreas Peter Bernstorff, politician (born 1735)
 20 August – Mariane Bournonville, ballet dancer (born 1768)

References

External links

 
1790s in Denmark
Denmark
Years of the 18th century in Denmark